Ryszard Robakiewicz (born 5 June 1962) is a Polish footballer. He played in three matches for the Poland national football team from 1987 to 1988.

References

External links
 

1962 births
Living people
Polish footballers
Poland international footballers
Place of birth missing (living people)
Association footballers not categorized by position